Nicolae Nemerenco (born 26 October 1992), is a Moldovan footballer who plays as a forward for Dacia Buiucani.

Club statistics
Total matches played in Moldovan First League: 7 matches - 0 goals

References

External links

Nicolae Nemerenco at Footballdatabase

1992 births
Living people
Footballers from Chișinău
Moldovan footballers
Association football forwards
Moldovan Super Liga players
Oman Professional League players
FC Dacia Chișinău players
FC Codru Lozova players
FC Sfîntul Gheorghe players
ACS Foresta Suceava players
Moldovan expatriate footballers
Expatriate footballers in Oman
Moldovan expatriate sportspeople in Romania
Expatriate footballers in Romania
Dacia Buiucani players